Sin Remitente (also known as Return to Sender and Sender Unknown) is a 1995 Mexican drama film written and directed by Carlos Carrera. The film was entered into the main competition at the 52nd edition of the Venice Film Festival. It also won three Ariel Awards, for best picture, best direction and  best actor.

Cast 
Fernando Torre Laphame as Andrés 
Tiaré Scanda as Mariana 
Luisa Huertas as Teresita de Jesús 
Guillermo Gil as Mario 
Luis Felipe Tovar as Luis Felipe 
Gina Morett as Beti 
Nora Velázquez	as Rosa, Mario's wife

Awards

Ariel Awards
The Ariel Awards are awarded annually by the Mexican Academy of Film Arts and Sciences in Mexico. Sin Remitente received four awards out of 14 nominations.

|-
|rowspan="14" scope="row"| 1996
|scope="row"| Sin Remitente
|scope="row"| Best Picture
| 
|-
|scope="row"| Carlos Carrera
|scope="row"| Best Direction
| 
|-
|scope="row"| Fernando Torre Lapham
|rowspan="1" scope="row"| Best Actor
| 

|-
|scope="row"| Guillermo Gil
|rowspan="1" scope="row"| Best Supporting Actor
| 
|-
|scope="row"| Gina Morett
|rowspan="1" scope="row"| Best Supporting Actress
| 
|-
|scope="row"| Luis Felipe Tovar
|rowspan="1" scope="row"| Best Actor in a Minor Role
| 
|-
|rowspan="1" scope="row"| Ignacio Ortíz Cruz and Silvia Pasternac 
|rowspan="1" scope="row"| Best Original Screenplay
| 
|-
|scope="row"| Juan Cristobal Pérez Grobet
|rowspan="1" scope="row"| Best Original Score
| 
|-
|scope="row"| Xavier Pérez Grobet
|rowspan="1" scope="row"| Best Cinematography
| 
|-
|scope="row"| Sigfrido Barjau
|rowspan="1" scope="row"| Best Editing
| 
|-
|rowspan="2" scope="row"| Gloria Carrasco
|rowspan="1" scope="row"| Best Production Design
| 
|-
|rowspan="1" scope="row"| Best Set Design
| 
|-
|scope="row"| Nerio Barberis and Salvador de la Fuente
|rowspan="1" scope="row"| Best Sound
| 
|-
|scope="row"|  Alejandro Vázquez
|rowspan="1" scope="row"| Best Special Effects
| 
|-

References

External links

   

1995 drama films
1995 films
Mexican drama films
Films directed by Carlos Carrera
1990s Spanish-language films
1990s Mexican films